Dunley is a village, and a civil parish (with Astley), in the administrative district of Malvern Hills in the county of Worcestershire, England.

References

External links

Villages in Worcestershire